The Academic Center for Education, Culture and Research (ACECR) is an Iranian private non-governmental higher education institution established in 1980.

Mission
ACECR engages in innovative research and development projects in different fields of science and technology and  real-world applications. Its activities can be broadly divided into the areas of: research and technology, education, cultural activities, and entrepreneurship.

Funding
Only 20% of ACECR's funding comes from public sources, while the majority of its funding is derived from partnerships and cooperation with the private sector.

Staffing
ACECR has 680 full-time research and academic staff, and 1,600 full-time research assistants.  Its activities are supported by 2,100 services and administrative staff.
Industry experts and post graduate research students also contribute to projects on a part-time basis.

Achievements 
 1999: The first ICSI birth by frozen sperm of a gonadectomized man, Royan Institute
 2003: The first human embryonic Stem Cell line establishment in Iran and the region, Royan Institute
 2005: Establishment of the first Private Cord Blood Bank in Iran (Royan Stem Cell Technology Co.)
 2006: Iran's first cloned sheep, named Royana, Royan Institute 
 2009: The first cloned goat born in Iran, Royan Institute
 2010: The first transgenic goats born in Iran, Royan Institute
 2011: Establishment of cell therapy pre-hospital, Royan Institute
 2015: A new formulation of anti-breast cancer drug Herceptin  using  a bacterial method by researchers led by Keyvan Majdzadeh produced 
 2017: The first transgenic zebrafish models in Iran, Royan Institute

References

External links
Academic Center for Education, Culture and Research
Avicenna Research Institute
Royan Institute
University of Science and Culture
ACECR, Sharif University Branch

Research institutes in Iran
Organizations established in 1980
Educational institutions established in 1980
1980 establishments in Iran
Higher education in Iran